Black Hawk (1833–1856) was an influential Morgan horse sire.

Life

Black Hawk was foaled in April 1833. He was sired by Sherman Morgan and out of an unnamed mare who was reputed to be half Thoroughbred. Black Hawk was bred by Benjamin Kelly of Durham, New Hampshire. 
Black Hawk was sold multiple times during his early years, and in 1844 he was sold for $800 to his final owner, David Hill of Bridport, Vermont. During his years with Hill, he sired 1,772 foals, one of which, Ethan Allen, himself became well known as a sire.
Black Hawk was trained to harness and according to his various owners, often driven 50 miles in one day. Black Hawk died December 1, 1856.

Sire line tree

Black Hawk
Blood's Black Hawk
Gist's Black Hawk
Cabell's Lexington
Pay Roll
Parole
Man of the Hour
Ethan Allen
Daniel Lambert
Holabird's Ethan Allen
Delong's Ethan Allen
American Ethan
Honest Allen

References

Individual Morgan horses